Hineman is a surname. Notable people with the surname include:

Don Hineman (born 1947), American politician
Miles Hineman (1851–1930), American politician

See also
Wineman